Filip Jagiełło (born 8 August 1997) is a Polish professional footballer who plays as a midfielder for Italian  club Genoa.

Career
Born in Lubin, Poland, Jagiełło started his career in his local club Zagłębie Lubin. When he was a teenager, he was targeted by clubs such as Juventus and AFC Ajax but decided to stay in Lubin.

He made his debut for Zagłębie in a 1–2 defeat to Ruch Chorzów on 15 December 2013.

On 31 January 2019, Jagiełło signed a 4.5-year contract with Italian club Genoa and was loaned back to Zagłębie for the remainder of the 2018–19 season.

On 5 October 2020, he joined Serie B club Brescia on loan. Jagiełło returned to Brescia on another season-long loan on 9 August 2021.

References

External links
 
 

Living people
1997 births
People from Lubin
Association football midfielders
Polish footballers
Poland youth international footballers
Poland under-21 international footballers
Zagłębie Lubin players
Genoa C.F.C. players
Brescia Calcio players
Ekstraklasa players
Serie A players
Serie B players
Polish expatriate footballers
Expatriate footballers in Italy